This list of Latin and Greek words commonly used in systematic names is intended to help those unfamiliar with classical languages to understand and remember the scientific names of organisms. The binomial nomenclature used for animals and plants is largely derived from Latin and Greek words, as are some of the names used for higher taxa, such as orders and above. At the time when biologist Carl Linnaeus (1707–1778) published the books that are now accepted as the starting point of binomial nomenclature, Latin was used in Western Europe as the common language of science, and scientific names were in Latin or Greek: Linnaeus continued this practice.
 
While learning Latin is now less common, it is still used by classical scholars, and for certain purposes in botany, medicine and the Roman Catholic Church, and it can still be found in scientific names. It is helpful to be able to understand the source of scientific names. Although the Latin names do not always correspond to the current English common names, they are often related, and if their meanings are understood, they are easier to recall. The binomial name often reflects limited knowledge or hearsay about a species at the time it was named. For instance Pan troglodytes, the chimpanzee, and Troglodytes troglodytes, the wren, are not necessarily cave-dwellers.
 
Sometimes a genus name or specific descriptor is simply the Latin or Greek name for the animal (e.g. Canis is Latin for dog). These words may not be included in the table below if they only occur for one or two taxa. Instead, the words listed below are the common adjectives and other modifiers that repeatedly occur in the scientific names of many organisms (in more than one genus).
 
Adjectives vary according to gender, and in most cases only the lemma form (nominative singular masculine form) is listed here. 1st-and-2nd-declension adjectives end in -us (masculine), -a (feminine) and -um (neuter), whereas 3rd-declension adjectives ending in -is (masculine and feminine) change to -e (neuter). For example, verus is listed without the variants for Aloe vera or Galium verum.

The second part of a binomial is often a person's name in the genitive case, ending -i (masculine) or -ae (feminine), such as Kaempfer's tody-tyrant, Hemitriccus kaempferi. The name may be converted into a Latinised form first, giving -ii and -iae instead.

Words that are very similar to their English forms have been omitted.
 
Some of the Greek transliterations given are Ancient Greek, and others are Modern Greek.
 
In the tables, L = Latin, G = Greek, and LG = similar in both languages.

A

B

C

D

E

F

G

H

I–K

L

M

N

O

P

Q

R

S

T

U

V

X–Z

See also
 Glossary of scientific naming
 List of commonly used taxonomic affixes
 List of descriptive plant species epithets (A–H)
 List of descriptive plant species epithets (I–Z)
 List of Greek and Latin roots in English
 List of Latin place names used as specific names
 List of Latin words with English derivatives
 List of medical roots, suffixes and prefixes
 List of taxa named by anagrams
 Latin names of cities

References

External links
 Latin names decoded with relevant images/photos at agrozoo.net
 Dictionary of botanical epithets
 European Species Names in Linnaean, Czech, English, German and French

Systematic
Greek words and phrases
 Systematic
Systematic
Taxonomy (biology)
Latin and Greek words commonly used in systematic names
Wikipedia glossaries using tables